The  were Christian missionaries and followers who were persecuted and executed, mostly during the Tokugawa shogunate period in the 17th century.
More than 400 martyrs of Japan have been recognized with beatification by the Catholic Church, and 42 have been canonized as saints.

Early Christianity in Japan 

Christian missionaries arrived with Francis Xavier and the Jesuits in the 1540s and briefly flourished, with over 100,000 converts, including many daimyōs in Kyushu. The shogunate and imperial government at first supported the Catholic mission and the missionaries, thinking that they would reduce the power of the Buddhist monks, and help trade with Spain and Portugal. However, the Shogunate was also wary of colonialism, seeing that the Spanish had taken power in the Philippines, after converting the population. It soon met resistance from the highest office holders of Japan. Emperor Ōgimachi issued edicts to ban Catholicism in 1565 and 1568, but to little effect. Beginning in 1587 with imperial regent Toyotomi Hideyoshi's ban on Jesuit missionaries, Christianity was repressed as a threat to national unity. While the Japanese view was that Christians were persecuted and executed for being more loyal to Jesus than the Shogunate, the Catholic Church viewed them as martyrs: As the persecution was aimed at Christians as a group, and as they could escape only by abjuring their faith, the Catholic Church regarded the acts as being in odium fidei ("in hatred of the faith"), a principal factor in martyrdom. After the Tokugawa shogunate banned Christianity in 1614, it ceased to exist publicly. Many Catholics went underground, becoming , while others lost their lives. Only after the Meiji Restoration, was Christianity re-established in Japan.

26 Martyrs of Japan (1597) 

The  refers to a group of Christians who were executed by crucifixion on February 5, 1597 at Nagasaki.

Through the promulgation of decree on martyrdom, these first Martyrs of Japan were beatified on 14 September 1627 by Pope Urban VIII. These saints were canonized saints on 8 June 1862 by Pope Pius IX.

205 Martyrs of Japan (1598–1632) 

Persecution flared episodically and over a period of 15 years, between 1617 and 1632, 205 missionaries and native Christians are known to have been killed for their faith. Christianity was proscribed and forced underground until the arrival of Western missionaries in the nineteenth century.

Through the promulgation of decree on martyrdom, these 205 Martyrs of Japan were venerated on 26 February 1866 and beatified on 7 May 1867, by Pope Pius IX.

Augustine Recollects Martyrs (1632) 

Two Spanish Augustinians arrived in Japan in the later half of 1632 from Manila to evangelize the Japanese. Upon arrival, Japanese authorities were notified by the Chinese merchants who had given them passage. The Augustinians fled into the mountains where Dominican missionaries instructed them in the language of the country. When they descended into the city they were recognized and arrested in November, 1632. On 11 December 1632, they were martyred for their faith.

Through the promulgation of decree on martyrdom, these two Augustinian Martyrs of Japan were venerated on 28 November 1988 and beatified on 23 April 1989, by Pope John Paul II.

16 Martyrs of Japan (1633–1637) 

The martyrdom continued on with a group of missionaries and natives that belonged to the Philippine Province of the Dominican Order, called the Holy Rosary Province.

Through the promulgation of decree on martyrdom, these 16 Martyrs of Japan were venerated on 11 October 1980 and beatified on 18 February 1981, by Pope John Paul II. They were later canonized saints on 18 October 1987, by Pope John Paul II.

188 Martyrs of Japan (1603–1639) 
These martyrs are additional religious priests and laity murdered for their faith between the years 1603 and 1639.

Through the promulgation of decree on martyrdom, these 188 Martyrs of Japan were venerated on 1 June 2007 and beatified on 24 November 2008, by Pope Benedict XVI.

See also

Twenty-Six Martyrs Museum and Monument
Christianity in Japan
Roman Catholicism in Japan
Nanban trade
Silence (2016 film)
Christianization

Notes

External links
The 26 Martyrs Museum in Nagasaki City, Japan
Catholic Bishops Conference of Japan: Timeline of the Catholic Church in Japan
Daughters of St. Paul Convent, Tokyo, Japan: Prohibition of Christian religion by Hideyoshi and the 26 martyrs
 
The Japanese Martyrs
Nagasaki Wiki: Detailed Access Information from Nagasaki Station to 26 Martyrs Monument
2008 Beatification of Japanese Martyrs
 Kirish'tan:  Heaven's Samurai,  a historical novel that includes the story of the Twenty-six Martyrs
Britto, Francis. All About Francis Xavier

Catholic martyrs of the Early Modern era
Christian saints
Martyrs
16th century in Japan
17th century in Japan
Martyred groups
Persecution by Buddhists
People executed by Japan
Martyrs
Lists of Christian martyrs
Lists of saints
Beatifications by Pope Pius IX
Beatifications by Pope John Paul II
Beatifications by Pope Benedict XVI
Groups of Roman Catholic saints